is a supplementary Japanese school located in the Seattle metropolitan area. It holds its classes in Bellevue.

History
It was established in 1971. The founders were employed at businesses.

In 1986 the school moved to Bellevue since most of the students resided in the Eastside of King County, Washington.

Student body
 the student body numbered 600, with the majority being children of Japanese citizens on work visas. As of that year some students originated from Tacoma, and others came from Anacortes.

See also
 History of the Japanese in Seattle

References

Further reading

 Fujimori, Hiroko (藤森 弘子; Tokyo University of Foreign Studies, Japanese Language Center for International Students (留学生日本語教育センター)). "The Current State of Japanese Language Teaching in the U.S.A. : Report on Visits to a Saturday Japanese School for Japanese Students and Japanese Classes at Secondary Schools in the U.S.A." (米国日本語教育事情調査 : REX派遣先校と日本語補習授業校を視察して; Archive). Bulletin of Japanese Language Center for International Students (留学生日本語教育センター論集) 30, p. 139-152, 2004–03. Tokyo University of Foreign Studies. See profile at CiNii. See profile at Tokyo University of Foreign Studies Prometheus-Academic Collections (東京外国語大学学術成果コレクション). English abstract available (Archive). This Saturday school is discussed in section 3-3, beginning on page 143.
 砂原　由和 (ネットワーク情報学部　助教授). "レドモンド教育事情" (Archive). 資格課程年報Passo a Passo (『パッソ ア パッソ』). Hosted at Senshu University. Start p. 5-6 (PDF pages p. 5-6).

Japanese-American culture in Seattle
Schools in Washington (state)
Bellevue, Washington
Education in Seattle
Seattle